Jarmo Ahjupera (born 13 April 1984) is a retired Estonian professional footballer. He played the position of striker. After ending his professional career, he has played for various amateur teams.

Club career
In 2009 February, Jarmo Ahjupera signed a 3,5-year deal with the Hungarian side Győri ETO FC. On 28 March 2009, in a League Cup match against FC Fehérvár, he suffered broken leg after a late tackle by Marko Andić.

In February 2011, he was loaned to Újpest FC, where he scored 8 goals in 15 appearances.

International career
When making the debut on 4 July 2001, Ahjupera (then aged 17 years and 82 days) became the youngest debutant of Estonia. He scored his first goal on 14 November 2012 in a friendly against United Arab Emirates, putting the ball firmly into the net after receiving a long pass from midfield by Konstantin Vassiljev.

International goals
Scores and results list Estonia's goal tally first.

Honours

Club
 FC Valga
 Estonian Second Division: 2002
 Runners Up: 2001
 FC Flora Tallinn
 Estonian Top Division: 2003
 Runners Up: 2007, 2008
 Estonian Cup: 2008
 Runners Up: 2003, 2006
 Estonian SuperCup: 2003, 2004
 Runners Up: 2006

References

External links

ESBL biography

1984 births
Living people
People from Võhma
Estonian footballers
Association football forwards
Estonia international footballers
FC Flora players
Players
JK Tervis Pärnu players
FC Valga players
Viljandi JK Tulevik players
Győri ETO FC players
Újpest FC players
Nemzeti Bajnokság I players
Estonian expatriate footballers
Expatriate footballers in Hungary
Estonian expatriate sportspeople in Hungary